Jorge Ariel Fernández Gerez (born 9 March 1982 in Lomas de Zamora) is an Argentine footballer.

References

External links
 Profile at www.football.ch

1982 births
Living people
Argentine footballers
Rangers de Talca footballers
Carabobo F.C. players
FC Gossau players
Pinatar CF players
UAI Urquiza players
Argentine expatriate footballers
Expatriate footballers in Chile
Argentine expatriate sportspeople in Chile
Expatriate footballers in Venezuela
Argentine expatriate sportspeople in Venezuela
Expatriate footballers in Switzerland
Argentine expatriate sportspeople in Switzerland
Expatriate footballers in Spain
Argentine expatriate sportspeople in Spain
Association football midfielders
People from Lomas de Zamora
Sportspeople from Buenos Aires Province